Qanat Zarshk may refer to:
 Qanat Zarshk-e Sofla